Vine-Glo was a grape concentrate brick product sold in the United States during Prohibition by Fruit Industries Ltd, a front for the California Vineyardist Association (CVA), from 1929. It was sold as a grape concentrate to make grape juice from but it included a specific warning that told people how to make wine from it. Fruit Industries ceased producing it in 1931 following a federal court ruling that making wine from concentrate violated section 29 of the Volstead Act.

History 
When Prohibition banned alcohol in the United States under the Volstead Act, it produced a number of loopholes. One under section 29 said that non-alcoholic grape products could still be sold and people could make fruit juices at home from them. The CVA founded Fruit Industries and received a $1,300,000 loan from the Federal Farm Board. Joseph Gallo, father of vintners Ernest and Julio Gallo, invented Vine-Glo as a legal grape concentrate brick and would sell it through Fruit Industries. On the packaging, it included a very specific warning: "After dissolving the brick in a gallon of water, do not place the liquid in a jug away in the cupboard for twenty days, because then it would turn into wine." Fruit Industries also promoted the Farm Board and carried a statement it was "legal in your own home".

When the product went on sale, 1 million gallons of Vine-Glo were sold with eight wine-flavored varieties created in the first financial year.  The product was sold across the United States. When Fruit Industries were trying to launch the product in Chicago in 1930, they published a statement saying that Al Capone had threatened to force them out of Chicago, but they would not be intimidated, and would push on. However, it has been speculated that this was just a promotional tactic. The product eventually went on sale in New York State in 1931.

Cessation 
When Vine-Glo was introduced, the drys protested it but the Assistant Attorney General Mabel Walker Willebrandt ruled that it was legal under the Volstead Act and the Bureau of Prohibition told its agents not to interfere with shipments. By 1931, Fruit Industries produced advertisements asserting that Vine-Glo did not break any laws following constant criticism from dry-supporting communities. When Willebrandt stepped down from the government she became an attorney for Fruit Industries. This conflict of interest embarrassed the government, which started to treat Vine-Glo in a more hostile manner. Though Fruit Industries got another $1,000,000 loan from the Farm Board in October 1931, in the same month a federal judge ruled in United States v Brunett  that grape concentrate could not be legally used to make fruit juice. Fruit Industries ceased making Vine-Glo a month later after the court decision was affirmed by the Director of the Bureau of Prohibition who said they would not allow grape concentrate to be exempt under section 29.

References 

Products and services discontinued in 1931
Prohibition in the United States
Grape juice
American wine